Hamburg is a borough in Sussex County, New Jersey, United States. As of the 2020 United States Census, the borough's population was 3,266, a decline of 11 (−0.3%) from the 2010 census count of 3,277, in turn reflecting an increase of 172 (+5.5%) from the 3,105 counted at the 2000 census. The United States Census Bureau estimated the population of Hamburg to have increased by 16 (+0.5%) to 3,282, the borough's highest level ever.

In 1753, when Sussex County was formed from portions of Morris County, the area of present-day Hamburg was part of New Town; on February 25, 1762, it became part of the newly established Hardyston Township. On April 8, 1793, when Vernon Township was formed from Hardyston, Hamburg was included within the boundaries of Vernon. In 1852, the boundary line was changed so that Hamburg was again in Hardyston Township. Hamburg was incorporated as a borough on March 19, 1920, from portions of Hardyston Township, based on the results of a referendum held on April 24, 1920. The borough was named after Hamburg, Germany.

Geography
According to the United States Census Bureau, the borough had a total area of 1.17 square miles (3.03 km2), including 1.15 square miles (2.96 km2) of land and 0.02 square miles (0.06 km2) of water (2.05%).

Hamburg borders the Sussex County municipalities of Franklin and Hardyston Township.

Demographics

2010 census

The Census Bureau's 2006–2010 American Community Survey showed that (in 2010 inflation-adjusted dollars) median household income was $64,016 (with a margin of error of +/− $6,681) and the median family income was $74,421 (+/− $13,156). Males had a median income of $66,083 (+/− $11,467) versus $40,735 (+/− $7,620) for females. The per capita income for the borough was $30,528 (+/− $3,671). About 7.0% of families and 7.8% of the population were below the poverty line, including 11.6% of those under age 18 and 12.8% of those age 65 or over.

2000 census
As of the 2000 United States census there were 3,105 people, 1,173 households, and 844 families residing in the borough. The population density was 2,686.6 people per square mile (1,033.5/km2). There were 1,233 housing units at an average density of 1,066.9 per square mile (410.4/km2). The racial makeup of the borough was 93.14% White, 0.74% African American, 0.29% Native American, 2.29% Asian, 1.67% from other races, and 1.87% from two or more races. Hispanic or Latino of any race were 4.22% of the population.

There were 1,173 households, out of which 37.3% had children under the age of 18 living with them, 57.7% were married couples living together, 10.5% had a female householder with no husband present, and 28.0% were non-families. 23.3% of all households were made up of individuals, and 6.0% had someone living alone who was 65 years of age or older. The average household size was 2.65 and the average family size was 3.14.

In the borough the population was spread out, with 26.8% under the age of 18, 7.1% from 18 to 24, 35.2% from 25 to 44, 22.8% from 45 to 64, and 8.1% who were 65 years of age or older. The median age was 35 years. For every 100 females, there were 92.1 males. For every 100 females age 18 and over, there were 90.9 males.

The median income for a household in the borough was $58,246, and the median income for a family was $64,773. Males had a median income of $45,729 versus $28,482 for females. The per capita income for the borough was $24,651. About 3.1% of families and 4.6% of the population were below the poverty line, including 5.9% of those under age 18 and 6.4% of those age 65 or over.

Government

Local government
Hamburg is governed under the Borough form of New Jersey municipal government, which is used in 218 municipalities (of the 564) statewide, making it the most common form of government in New Jersey. The governing body is comprised of the Mayor and the Borough Council, with all positions elected at-large on a partisan basis as part of the November general election. The Mayor is elected directly by the voters to a four-year term of office. The Borough Council is comprised of six members elected to serve three-year terms on a staggered basis, with two seats coming up for election each year in a three-year cycle. The Borough form of government used by Hamburg is a "weak mayor / strong council" government in which council members act as the legislative body with the mayor presiding at meetings and voting only in the event of a tie. The mayor can veto ordinances subject to an override by a two-thirds majority vote of the council. The mayor makes committee and liaison assignments for council members, and most appointments are made by the mayor with the advice and consent of the council.

, the Mayor of Hamburg Borough is Republican Paul Marino, whose term of office ends December 31, 2022. Members of the Borough Council are John Burd (R, 2022), John Haig (R, 2024), Richard Krasnomowitz (R, 2023), Russell Law (R, 2022), Joyce Oehler (R, 2023) and Mark S. Sena (R, 2024).

In August 2018, Joyce Oehler was appointed to fill the seat expiring in December 2020 that had been held by Chris Fitzpatrick until he resigned from office. In November 2018, Oehler was elected to serve the balance of the term of office.

In April 2014, the Borough Council selected former councilmember Russell Law from a list of three candidates nominated by the Republican municipal committee to fill the vacant seat expiring in December 2016 of Chris Kelly, who had resigned from office after announcing that he would be moving out of the borough. Law served on an interim basis until the November 2014 general election, when he was elected to serve the one year remaining on the term of office.

Federal, state and county representation
Hamburg is located in the 5th Congressional District and is part of New Jersey's 24th state legislative district.

 

Sussex County is governed by a Board of County Commissioners whose five members are elected at-large in partisan elections on a staggered basis, with either one or two seats coming up for election each year. At an annual reorganization meeting held in the beginning of January, the board selects a Commissioner Director and Deputy Director from among its members, with day-to-day supervision of the operation of the county delegated to a County Administrator. , Sussex County's Commissioners are 
Commissioner Director Anthony Fasano (R, Hopatcong, term as commissioner and as commissioner director ends December 31, 2022), 
Deputy Director Chris Carney (R, Frankford Township, term as commissioner ends 2024; term as deputy director ends 2022), 
Dawn Fantasia (R, Franklin, 2024), 
Jill Space (R, Wantage Township, 2022; appointed to serve an unexpired term) and 
Herbert Yardley (R, Stillwater Township, 2023). In May 2022, Jill Space was appointed to fill the seat expiring in December 2022 that had been held by Sylvia Petillo until she resigned from office.

Constitutional officers elected on a countywide basis are 
County Clerk Jeffrey M. Parrott (R, Wantage Township, 2026),
Sheriff Michael F. Strada (R, Hampton Township, 2022) and 
Surrogate Gary R. Chiusano (R, Frankford Township, 2023). The County Administrator is Gregory V. Poff II, whose appointment expires in 2025.

Politics
As of March 23, 2011, there were a total of 2,064 registered voters in Hamburg, of which 322 (15.6% vs. 16.5% countywide) were registered as Democrats, 752 (36.4% vs. 39.3%) were registered as Republicans and 988 (47.9% vs. 44.1%) were registered as Unaffiliated. There were 2 voters registered as either Libertarians or Greens. Among the borough's 2010 Census population, 63.0% (vs. 65.8% in Sussex County) were registered to vote, including 81.3% of those ages 18 and over (vs. 86.5% countywide).

In the 2012 presidential election, Republican Mitt Romney received 733 votes (53.6% vs. 59.4% countywide), ahead of Democrat Barack Obama with 594 votes (43.5% vs. 38.2%) and other candidates with 30 votes (2.2% vs. 2.1%), among the 1,367 ballots cast by the borough's 2,104 registered voters, for a turnout of 65.0% (vs. 68.3% in Sussex County). In the 2008 presidential election, Republican John McCain received 852 votes (57.1% vs. 59.2% countywide), ahead of Democrat Barack Obama with 606 votes (40.6% vs. 38.7%) and other candidates with 24 votes (1.6% vs. 1.5%), among the 1,491 ballots cast by the borough's 2,007 registered voters, for a turnout of 74.3% (vs. 76.9% in Sussex County). In the 2004 presidential election, Republican George W. Bush received 893 votes (63.0% vs. 63.9% countywide), ahead of Democrat John Kerry with 490 votes (34.6% vs. 34.4%) and other candidates with 27 votes (1.9% vs. 1.3%), among the 1,417 ballots cast by the borough's 1,897 registered voters, for a turnout of 74.7% (vs. 77.7% in the whole county).

In the 2013 gubernatorial election, Republican Chris Christie received 67.7% of the vote (570 cast), ahead of Democrat Barbara Buono with 29.7% (250 votes), and other candidates with 2.6% (22 votes), among the 851 ballots cast by the borough's 2,115 registered voters (9 ballots were spoiled), for a turnout of 40.2%. In the 2009 gubernatorial election, Republican Chris Christie received 546 votes (59.2% vs. 63.3% countywide), ahead of Democrat Jon Corzine with 283 votes (30.7% vs. 25.7%), Independent Chris Daggett with 78 votes (8.5% vs. 9.1%) and other candidates with 12 votes (1.3% vs. 1.3%), among the 922 ballots cast by the borough's 1,985 registered voters, yielding a 46.4% turnout (vs. 52.3% in the county).

Education
The Hamburg School District serves students in public school for kindergarten through eighth grade at Hamburg School. As of the 2018–19 school year, the district, comprised of one school, had an enrollment of 243 students and 29.3 classroom teachers (on an FTE basis), for a student–teacher ratio of 8.3:1.

Public school students in ninth through twelfth grades attend Wallkill Valley Regional High School together with students from Franklin Borough, Hardyston Township and Ogdensburg Borough. As of the 2018–19 school year, the high school had an enrollment of 604 students and 56.0 classroom teachers (on an FTE basis), for a student–teacher ratio of 10.8:1.

Transportation

Roads and highways

Route 23 and Route 94 intersect and pass through the borough.

Public transportation
Hamburg is served by the Sussex County Skylands Ride Service, which provides buses to Newton, Sparta, and Sussex.

Wineries
 Cava Winery & Vineyard

Notable people

People who were born in, residents of, or otherwise closely associated with Hamburg include:

 Daniel Haines (1801–1877), politician, jurist and lawyer who served as the 14th Governor of New Jersey
 Robert Hamilton (1809–1878), represented  in the United States House of Representatives from 1873–1877
 Heather Maloney (born 1985), singer-songwriter
 Andrew J. Rogers (1828–1900), represented  in the United States House of Representatives from 1863–1867
 Joseph Sharp (–1776), iron manufacturer and industrialist who established an iron works that led to the area being known as Sharpsborough

References

Further reading
 McCabe, Wayne T.; and McCabe, Margaret L.  A Penny A View...An Album of Postcard Views...Hamburg, N.J. (Newton, NJ: Historic Preservation Alternatives, 2006).
 Truran, William R. Franklin, Hamburg, Ogdensburg, and Hardyston (Images of America). (Charleston, SC: Arcadia Publishing, 2004).

External links

 Hamburg Borough website

 
1920 establishments in New Jersey
Borough form of New Jersey government
Boroughs in Sussex County, New Jersey
Populated places established in 1920